Elections were held in the Australian state of Western Australia in late 1905 to elect 50 members to the state's Legislative Assembly. The main polling day was 27 October, although four remote electorates (Dundas, Gascoyne, Kimberley, and Pilbara) went to the polls on 13 November.

Hector Rason, the sitting premier and a member of the Ministerialist faction, had taken office on 25 August 1905 at the head of a minority government, following the fall of the previous minority government led by Henry Daglish of the Labour Party. Daglish resigned as party leader on 27 September, and was replaced by William Johnson on 4 October. At the election, Rason and the Ministerialists recorded a landslide victory, with their gain of 15 seats allowing them to form a comfortable majority government. Eight Labour members lost their seats, including their leader Johnson, who was defeated in Kalgoorlie by Norbert Keenan.

Results

|}

See also
 Members of the Western Australian Legislative Assembly, 1904–1905
 Members of the Western Australian Legislative Assembly, 1905–1908

Notes
 The total number of enrolled voters was 121,722, of whom 19,720 were registered in 11 uncontested seats. Eight of the uncontested seats were won by Ministerialists and three by Labour.

References

Elections in Western Australia
1905 elections in Australia
1900s in Western Australia
October 1905 events
November 1905 events